Fort São Caetano is a 16th century fort that was built in the 16th century in what is now Sofala, Mozambique. The fort dates back to 1505 where Pêro de Anaia took the title of Captain-General of Sofala and officially made it the first Portuguese colony in the region.
Pêro de Anaia created a factory and Fort São Caetano from stones imported from Europe.

Infrastructure completed in 1505
Sao Caetano
Portuguese forts
1505 establishments in Portuguese Mozambique
Buildings and structures in Sofala Province
Portuguese colonial architecture in Mozambique